Christopher Vashon Moss (born February 7, 1980) is an American former professional basketball player, who played the power forward position. He played for many teams overseas, including Deutsche Bank Skyliners, but has spent time in Israel, Spain, France, Japan, Puerto Rico, and Argentina as well.

Clubs 
 West Virginia University - NCAA (USA) - 1998/2001
 Hapoel Ironi Nahariya - BSL (Israel) - 2001/2002
 AS Golbey Epinal - Pro B (France) - 2002/2003
 Menorca Bàsquet - LEB (Spain) - 2003/2005
 ViveMenorca - ACB (Spain) - 2005/2008
 CB Murcia - ACB (Spain) - 2008/2010
 Deutsche Bank Skyliners - Basketball Bundesliga (Germany) - 2011/present

Honors 
Individual honors for club
ACB League's MVP of the Month - May 2007 
ACB League's MVP of the Month - October 2007

Career statistics
 Correct as of 23 June 2007

References

External links 

 ACB Profile
 Basketpedya.com Profile

1980 births
Living people
American expatriate basketball people in Argentina
American expatriate basketball people in France
American expatriate basketball people in Germany
American expatriate basketball people in Israel
American expatriate basketball people in Japan
American expatriate basketball people in South Korea
American expatriate basketball people in Spain
American expatriate basketball people in Uruguay
American men's basketball players
Basketball players from Columbus, Ohio
CB Murcia players
Club Biguá de Villa Biarritz basketball players
Ironi Nahariya players
Israeli Basketball Premier League players
Kawasaki Brave Thunders players
Liga ACB players
Menorca Bàsquet players
Peñarol de Mar del Plata basketball players
Skyliners Frankfurt players
West Virginia Mountaineers men's basketball players
Wonju DB Promy players
Power forwards (basketball)